Usmanovo (Uśman) is a rural locality (a village) in Tanovsky Selsoviet, Blagovarsky District, Bashkortostan, Russia. The population was 54 as of 2010. There is 1 street.

Geography 
Usmanovo is located 27 km north of Yazykovo (the district's administrative centre) by road. Takchura is the nearest rural locality.

References 

Rural localities in Blagovarsky District